This is a list of world championships medalists in men's powerlifting.

The various federations of powerlifting have their own championships. The International Powerlifting Federation's (IPF) recognition by the International Olympic Committee as the official governing body, as well its longevity has resulted in their championships being deemed the official world championships, and the results of these are shown below. However, other respected federations have had their own world champions also (much as boxing world champions are divided among a myriad of organizations). For world champions associated with other federations see the articles for those federations for more information.

Current categories - Classic

-59 kg

-66 kg

-74 kg

-83 kg

-93 kg

-105 kg

-120 kg

120+ kg

Gold Medal Totals

Current categories - Equipped

Category 59 kg - Equipped

Category 66 kg - Equipped

Category 74 kg

Category 83 kg

Category 93 kg

Category 105 kg

Category 120 kg

Category +120 kg

Category Special Olympics International

Old categories

Category 52 kg

Category 56 kg

Category 60 kg

Category 67.5 kg

Category 75 kg

Category 82.5 kg

Category 90 kg

Category 100 kg

Category 110 kg

Category 125 kg

Category open
 1973–1980: +110 kg
 1981–2010: +125 kg

See also
List of world championships medalists in powerlifting (women)

References
Meet results IPF at en.allpowerlifting.com (several results)
 

List
Powerlifting World Championships men